The 1994 season of 2. deild karla was the 29th season of third-tier football in Iceland.

Standings

Top scorers

References
 

2. deild karla seasons
Iceland
Iceland
3